Tighvein is a hill above Lamlash on the Isle of Arran in western Scotland. It is a Marilyn (a hill with topographic prominence of at least 150m) and the highest point on the south-eastern section of the island, south-east of the pass of Monambre Glen. Two miles from the nearest road, the top is a heathery, boggy moor, almost entirely ringed by thick forestry plantations. It is rarely climbed as there are no paths to the top.

Footnotes

Marilyns of Scotland
Mountains and hills of the Southern Highlands
Mountains and hills of the Isle of Arran